The Nelson Mandela Bridges (French: Ponts Nelson-Mandela) are two twin bridges in France, spanning the river Seine, between Ivry-sur-Seine and Charenton-le-Pont, where the Seine and the Marne have their confluence. Initially they were both called the "" ("Confluence Bridge"), but were renamed for Nelson Mandela, the first democratically elected President of South Africa. They now form part of the D103  and the A4 autoroute.

References

Bridges in France